Willow Man is a large outdoor sculpture by Serena de la Hey. It is in a field to the west of the M5 motorway, near Bridgwater in Somerset, South West England, near to the Bristol to Exeter railway line and south of junction 23 of the motorway. It stands , with a  arm span, and is made of black maul willow withies woven over a 3-tonne steel frame.

Willow Man was commissioned by South West Arts, for the Year of the Artist, and the Moate family the land owner. The sculpture, which cost , was unveiled in September 2000.
It marks the millennium and celebrates the role of willow in the ecology and craft tradition of the Somerset Levels.

The first sculpture was burnt down in an arson attack on 8 May 2001.
The sculpture was rebuilt by the same artist in October 2001,
and a  circular moat was excavated around it as a precaution against further attacks.

A notable landmark, it can be described as a somehow permanent Wicker man sculpture. The sculpture is popularly known as Withy Man, or Angel of the South in reference to Antony Gormley's sculpture Angel of the North. The name Angel of the South is now commonly used also as the unofficial title for a proposed colossal sculpture in Ebbsfleet.

In September 2006, Willow Man received "a £20,000 hair cut".
The sculptor Serena de la Hey said that she thought many local birds had been using the material for their nests. When the artist saw her sculpture she was "shocked to see the wear and tear".

In 2018, an appeal to raise funds for the repair of the structure failed to meet its target. By 2021, the structure had further deteriorated with the head and arms having lost form.

See also
 List of tallest statues

References

External links

 Serena de la Hey website
 BBC Interview with Serena de la Hey

Outdoor sculptures in England
Arts in Somerset
Somerset Levels
2000 sculptures
Buildings and structures in Sedgemoor
Wooden sculptures in the United Kingdom
Basket weaving
M5 motorway
Colossal statues in the United Kingdom